Brynsadler is a small village situated in Rhondda Cynon Taf, Wales, it is part of the community of Pontyclun.

Amenities
The A4222 main road to Cowbridge runs through the village; locally it is known tautologically as 'Brynsadler hill'. Brynsadler used to be home to the Crown Buckley brewery housed opposite the village pub, the Ivor Arms. The brewery was bought by S A Brain and eventually relocated to Cardiff. The brewery and brewery houses were demolished and a housing estate called "Clos Brenin" replaced it.

Brynsadler also housed a chapel, called Capel Zion, located opposite the post office. It closed down and was converted into housing accommodation.

Given its position between Llanharry and Pontyclun, Brynsadler is a pit stop for many summer activities such as fun runs.

Notes

Villages in Rhondda Cynon Taf